Milwaukee Brew (foaled January 31, 1997 in Kentucky) is an American Thoroughbred racehorse best known as one of only three horses to win back-to-back runnings of the Santa Anita Handicap. He is retired and moved to Old Friends Equine in 2020.

Background
Out of the mare Ask Anita, he was sired by the 1984 Breeders' Cup Classic winner, Wild Again, a grandson of Nearctic. Purchased by prominent Canadian businessman Frank Stronach.

Racing career
At age three Milwaukee Brew began his racing career at Woodbine Racetrack in Toronto, Ontario, before going south to compete in the United States.

Milwaukee Brew had his best earnings year in 2002 when he won the Californian Stakes and the first of his Santa Anita Handicaps, as well as running third in the Hollywood Gold Cup, Pacific Classic, and 2002 Breeders' Cup Classic (behind winner Volponi and runner-up Medaglia d'Oro).

Stud record
Retired after the 2003 racing season with earnings of more than $2.8 million, Milwaukee Brew stands at stud at his owner's Adena Springs South in Williston, Florida. His offspring's thirteen wins in 2008 were the most that year of any second-crop sire.

Pedigree
Milwaukee Brew’s pedigree is a rare American five-cross pedigree that lacks three common ancestors of the modern thoroughbred: Northern Dancer, Mr Prospector, and Bold Ruler.

References

 Milwaukee Brew's profile at Adena springs

1997 racehorse births
Racehorses bred in Kentucky
Racehorses trained in the United States
American Grade 1 Stakes winners
Thoroughbred family 20-a